In July 2022, the Islamist militant group al-Shabaab launched an invasion from Somalia into Ethiopia's Somali Region. Following attacks on the Somali side of the border, the rebel militants initially attacked Ethiopia's Afder Zone on 21 July and occupied the town of Hulhul before being driven back by Somali Region paramilitary forces. On 25 July, the militants launched a second incursion at Ferfer which was also defeated. Further cross-border attacks continued in the following days, while Ethiopia launched counter-attacks in response. Clashes between the Somali rebels and security forces inside Ethiopia extended into early August, and at least one small al-Shabaab contingent succeeded in evading the Ethiopian force and reached its main target, the Bale Mountains.

The invasion was the largest attack by al-Shabaab in Ethiopian territory to date.

Background 
Historically, the Ethiopian-Somali border has been disputed and been the place of several wars and minor armed conflicts. In addition, eastern Ethiopia has been affected by a number of ethno-nationalist rebellions, some of which were motivated by separatism in Somali Region and Oromia.

In the early 1980s, a rebellion began in Somalia. By 1991, the country was embroiled in a full-scale civil war. In the mid-1990s, a Somali militant group named Al-Itihaad al-Islamiya began to launch raids into Ethiopia. In doing so, it possibly forged links with local rebels such as the Islamic Front for the Liberation of Oromia (IFLO). In 1996, Ethiopia responded to these raids by launching its first armed intervention into Somalia, followed by another intervention from 2006. Since then, the country has maintained an armed presence, deploying both the Ethiopian National Defense Force (ENDF) as well as the Liyu police in the neighboring country. In its interventions, Ethiopia has fought various Somali rebel groups, most importantly al-Shabaab, Al-Itihaad al-Islamiya's successor. Internationally, al-Shabaab has aligned itself with al-Qaeda. The group has also voiced support for pan-Somali ideas, describing the Ethiopian-Somali border as "artificial".

Overall, al-Shabaab has only able to organize a few attacks inside Ethiopia. In 2006, an al-Shabaab force led by Aden Ayrow invaded Ethiopia in revenge of the Ethiopian intervention in Somalia, but this operation was quickly defeated. Al-Shabaab leader Ahmed Abdi Godane then set up the Jabhat or "Ethiopian Front" to organize terrorist attacks, but this force failed to make an impact. Further attack plans by al-Shabaab's intelligence wing Amniyaat were also foiled. Ethiopian officials often arrested suspected rebel infiltrators. In 2020, however, the Tigray War erupted and greatly weakened the ENDF, resulting in a partial withdrawal of Ethiopian forces from Somalia. Despite this, 4,000 Ethiopian troops remained stationed in Somalia as of mid-2022. Meanwhile, al-Shabaab experienced a period of growth, increasing the number of its attacks and capturing more territory in Somalia.

In 2021, it seemed as if the Ethiopian government might collapse due to the Tigray War; security analyst Matt Bryden argued that al-Shabaab probably began to plan an invasion around this time, hoping to exploit the instability of its long-standing enemy. The rebel group began to train thousands of fighters for this operation, recruiting large numbers of ethnic Somalis and Oromo from Ethiopia. A further incentive to launch an invasion presented itself when Hassan Sheikh Mohamud was elected President of Somalia; Hassan pledged to launch a more aggressive campaign against al-Shabaab which thus became concerned to "establish strategic depth" by expanding its area of operations into Ethiopia. Al-Shabaab also began to prepare for an invasion by trying to set up a small supporter network at El Kari, deep inside Ethiopia. In May 2022, the insurgents launched a series of attacks to weaken the Ethiopian and Somali pro-government presence at the border, possibly to prepare for the following invasion. In early July, Osman Abu Abdi Rahman, al-Shabaab governor of Bakool, declared war on the Liyu police. Five days before the invasion, Ethiopian security forces conducted a raid in El Kari, killing a local cleric called Sheikh Mohamed Hassan Osman who was identified as an "al-Shabab commander" and "worker".

Invasion 

The rebel offensive began on 20 July 2022, as al-Shabaab shut down the telephone networks across the South West State of Somalia. One al-Shabaab unit then launched a surprise attack on four settlements on the Somali side of the border, including the towns Aato and Yeed as well as the village of Washaaqo. These settlements were garrisoned by Ethiopian Liyu policemen. The rebels defeated the garrisons of Aato and Yeed and proceeded to burn down the Ethiopian bases at both towns. Around this time, al-Shabaab top leader Fu'ad Mohamed Khalaf visited Aato and used the opportunity to denounce the Liyu police. According to Voice of America journalist Harun Maruf, Critical Threats analysts Liam Karr and Emily Estelle, as well as Somali regional and intelligence officials, this first attack was a diversionary operation designed to facilitate an invasion into Ethiopian territory by another al-Shabaab force. Local officials and civilians stated that pro-government forces eventually retook Aato and Yeed. Both sides claimed to had inflicted heavy losses on the other.

On 20 or 21 July 2022, about 500 al-Shabaab fighters crossed the border at Yeed from Somalia's Bakool into Ethiopia's Afder Zone. The invading force reportedly mostly consisted of militants recruited from Ethiopia itself. Al-Shabaab's "Ethiopian Front", led by Ali Diyaar, was known to have taken part in the operation. The rebels advanced  into Ethiopian territory. They captured the town of Hulhul, but were encircled there by Somali Region paramilitary forces on 22 July. In the following, three-days-long battle for Hulhul, the rebel force was destroyed or at least forced to retreat. The Ethiopian government claimed that its troops had killed over 100 al-Shabaab rebels at Hulhul, and destroyed 13 vehicles.

On 24 or 25 July, an al-Shabaab contingent of about 200 fighters made another incursion at Ferfer, clashing with security forces at Lasqurun village. After some fighting, this attack was also repulsed by Somali Region security forces; the latter claimed to had killed 85 rebels during this clash. Meanwhile, the ENDF deployed reinforcements to the Somali Region. At this point, Ethiopian officials argued that all invaders had been eliminated, though security analysts cautioned that some rebels might had slipped through the pro-government defensive lines. The Ethiopian government later admitted that operations against al-Shabaab invaders were continuing. According to Critical Threats, one rebel unit had entered Ethiopia east of El Barde, and was still active between Gode and Kelafo by 27 July. A third invading force, counting several hundred al-Shabaab militants, reportedly also entered Ethiopia around this time. Rebels belonging to this force were subsequently sighted near El Kari, Jaraati, and Imi. According to "credible reports", some al-Shabaab troops were also moving toward Moyale.

The ENDF and Somali Region military began to plan a counter-offensive against the Somali insurgents, and subsequently launched a series of ground and air attacks along the border that inflicted several losses on the rebels. The Somali Region government also announced its plan to create a buffer zone along the border to prevent more rebel incursions. By 29 July, Aato was back under pro-government control, though was again attacked by a large al-Shabaab force. On 31 July, Ethiopia announced that it had killed three rebel commanders at the border, though al-Shabaab denied this. Fu'ad Mohamed Khalaf was reportedly among the dead, as was al-Shabaab's chief border commander, Ubeda Nur Isse, and a spokesman. Local civilians organized ad hoc self-defense groups to hunt for rebel stragglers. The clashes in Ethiopa lasted into early August, and one small al-Shabaab contingent (suspected to number 50 to 100 fighters) actually reached its target, the Bale Mountains, probably in the wider El Kari area.

Analysis 

Somali Region officials claimed that the al-Shabaab invaders had planned to advance up to Oromia to coordinate with the Oromo Liberation Army (OLA). OLA wages an independent insurgency against the Ethiopian government, and had become part of a major, cross-regional rebel alliance in 2021. However, the Long War Journal and other researchers argued that a cooperation between OLA and al-Shabaab is unlikely, as no independent proof of links between the two factions was surfaced so far. In addition, OLA is a secular nationalist group in stark contrast to al-Shabaab's strongly religious alignment. Instead, the official claims appeared to mirror previous statements of the Ethiopian government which has repeatedly alleged links between various local insurgent groups and al-Shabaab in order to frame any local rebels as terrorist organizations. Al-Shabaab has also previously rejected accusations of cooperating with Ethiopian rebels, stating that the latter were "un-Islamic" and "therefore unworthy of its support".

Independent journalists argued that al-Shabaab was probably not trying to coordinate with other insurgents, but instead trying to open a new frontline in Ethiopia. As fighting was still underway, Horn of Africa analyst Matt Bryden argued that the rebels had probably aimed to advance into the Bale Mountains. This was later confirmed by local officials and the movement of one al-Shabaab group. The Long War Journal speculated that al-Shabaab was intending to exploit the local tensions and fighting between various groups at Bale Mountains, including by OLA, to set up their own bases there.

Former al-Shabaab official Omar Mohamed Abu Ayan argued that the invasion had been probably conducted for propaganda reasons by the Somali insurgents.

Aftermath 
The Ethiopian government framed the invasion as a major victory over the invading force. However, a number of Somali Region officials informed Voice of America that the al-Shabaab invaders had inflicted heavy losses on the Ethiopians, and captured several local administrators before their main force was defeated. In addition, at least some of the invaders had reached their target, though Ethiopian officials claimed that they were too few in number to establish a viable presence. Somali Region President Mustafa Mohammed Omar stated that he had visited the troops who had retaken Hulhul, and thanked them for their service.

See Also 

 Ethiopian civil conflict (2018–present)

Notes

References

2022 in Somalia
2022 in Ethiopia
Battles in 2022
Battles of the Somali Civil War (2009–present)
July 2022 events in Africa
August 2022 events in Africa